| image               = 
| image_size          = 
| fullname            = Fernando Martín Falce Langone
| birth_date          = 
| birth_place         = 
| death_date          = 
| death_place         = 
| otheroccupation     = 
| years1              = 
| years2              = 
| league1             = Uruguayan Primera División
| league2             = 
| role1               = Referee
| role2               = 
| internationalyears1 = 2013–
| confederation1      = FIFA listed
| internationalrole1  = Referee
}}

Fernando Martín Falce Langone (born 19 February 1976) is an Uruguayan professional football referee. He refereed some matches in Copa Libertadores and Copa Sudamericana. He has been a FIFA referee since 2015.

Falce played football as a goalkeeper in his youth, never playing at a level higher than the fourth division with Miramar Misiones' reserve team. He studied to become a referee, and made his Uruguayan Primera División debut at age 24.

On 6 June 2015, he refereed his first international match: Paraguay versus Honduras.

He was selected for the 2015 Summer Universiade.

See also 
Football in Uruguay

References 

1976 births
Living people
Uruguayan football referees
Place of birth missing (living people)